Amanda Marie Knox (born July 9, 1987) is an American author, activist, and journalist. She spent almost four years in an Italian prison following her wrongful conviction for the 2007 murder of Meredith Kercher, a fellow exchange student with whom she shared an apartment in Perugia. In 2015, Knox was definitively acquitted by the Italian Supreme Court of Cassation.

Knox, aged 20 at the time of the murder, called the police after returning to her and Kercher's apartment following a night spent with her boyfriend, Raffaele Sollecito, and finding Kercher's bedroom door locked and blood in the bathroom. During the police interrogations that followed, the conduct of which is a matter of dispute, Knox allegedly implicated herself and her employer, Patrick Lumumba, in the murder. Initially, Knox, Sollecito, and Lumumba were all arrested for Kercher's murder, but Lumumba was soon released. In the initial trial, Knox and Sollecito were convicted and sentenced to 26 and 25 years in prison, respectively. A known burglar, Rudy Guede, was arrested a short time later following the discovery of his bloodstained fingerprints on Kercher's possessions. He was later found guilty of murder in a fast-track trial and was sentenced to a 30-year prison sentence, later reduced to 16 years. In December 2020, an Italian court ruled that Guede could complete his term doing community service.

Pre-trial publicity in Italian media (repeated by other media worldwide) portrayed Knox in a negative light, leading to complaints that the prosecution was using character assassination tactics. A guilty verdict at Knox's initial trial and her 26-year sentence caused international controversy, as U.S. forensic experts thought evidence at the crime scene was incompatible with her involvement. A prolonged legal process, including a successful prosecution appeal against her acquittal at a second-level trial, continued after Knox was freed in 2011. On March 27, 2015, Italy's highest court definitively exonerated Knox and Sollecito. However, Knox's conviction for committing defamation against Lumumba was upheld by all courts. On January 14, 2016, Knox was acquitted of defamation for saying she had been struck by policewomen during the interrogation.

Knox subsequently became an author, an activist, and a journalist. Her memoir, Waiting to Be Heard, became a best seller. In 2018, she began hosting The Scarlet Letter Reports, a television series which examined the "gendered nature of public shaming".

Early life 
Amanda Knox was born July 9, 1987, in Seattle, Washington, the eldest of three daughters born to Edda Mellas, a mathematics teacher originally from Germany, and Curt Knox, a vice president of finance for Macy's. Knox and her sisters were raised in West Seattle. Her parents divorced when she was 10 years old, after which her mother remarried to Chris Mellas, an information technology consultant.

Knox first travelled to Italy on a family holiday at the age of 15. During that first trip to Italy, she visited Rome, Pisa, the Amalfi Coast, and the ruins of Pompeii. Upon reading Under the Tuscan Sun, which was given to her by her mother, Amanda's interest in the country increased.

Knox graduated from the Seattle Preparatory School in 2005 and then studied linguistics at the University of Washington. In 2007, she made the  dean's list at the university. She worked at part-time jobs to fund an academic year in Italy. Relatives described the 20-year-old Knox as outgoing but unwary. Her stepfather had strong reservations about her going to Italy that year, as he felt she was still too naïve.

Italy

Perugia background
Knox had come to Perugia for its universities and because it had fewer tourists than Florence, a more popular destination for foreign students. The city had reportedly not had a murder for 20 years, but its prosecutors had been responsible for Italy's most controversial murder cases. A charge originated by Perugia prosecutors resulted in the 2002 conviction of former Prime Minister Giulio Andreotti for ordering the murder of journalist Carmine Pecorelli, and led to complaints that the justice system had "gone mad". The Supreme Court took the unusual step of definitively acquitting Andreotti the next year.

In early 2002, Perugia prosecutor Giuliano Mignini, who enjoyed taking a detective-like role and was later to be in charge of the Kercher investigation, arraigned members of a respectable Masonic lodge for an alleged conspiracy. Mignini reportedly based the case on a theory involving serial killings and Satanic rites. Mignini investigated fellow prosecutors for complicity in the supposed plot and appealed dismissals of the charges; there were no convictions in the case, which finally ended in 2010. According to a scholar who researched comparative law in Italy, selective changes to the Italian legal system left it unable to cope when a prosecutor with Mignini's American-style adversarial approach used his powers to the fullest.

Via della Pergola 7
In Perugia, Knox lived in a four-bedroom, ground-floor apartment at Via della Pergola 7 with three other women. Her flatmates were Kercher (a British exchange student) and two Italian trainee lawyers in their late twenties. Kercher and Knox moved in on September 10 and 20, 2007, respectively, meeting each other for the first time. Knox was employed part-time at a bar, Le Chic, which was owned by a Congolese man, Diya Patrick Lumumba. She told flatmates that she was going to quit because he was not paying her; Lumumba denied this. Kercher's English female friends saw relatively little of Knox, who preferred to socialize with Italians.

The walk-out semi-basement apartment of the building was rented by young Italian men with whom both Kercher and Knox were friendly. One, Giacomo Silenzi, spent time in the women's flat due to a shared interest in music. Returning home at 2 am one night in mid-October, Knox, Kercher, Silenzi, and another basement resident met a basketball court acquaintance of the Italians, Rudy Guede. Guede attached himself to the group and asked about Knox. He was invited into the basement by the Italians; Knox and then Kercher came down to join them. At 4:30 am Kercher left, saying she was going to bed, and Knox followed her out. Guede spent the rest of the night in the basement. Knox recalled a second night out with Kercher and Silenzi in which Guede joined them and was allowed into the basement. He was never invited into the women's apartment.

Three weeks before her death, Kercher went with Knox to the EuroChocolate festival. On October 20, Kercher became romantically involved with Silenzi, after going to a nightclub with him as part of a small group that included Knox. Guede visited the basement later that day. On October 25, Kercher and Knox went to a concert, where Knox met Raffaele Sollecito, a 23-year-old software engineer student. She began spending her time at his flat, a five-minute walk from Via della Pergola 7.

Discovery of body
November 1 was a public holiday, and the Italians living in the building were away. It is believed that after watching a movie at some friends' house, Kercher returned home around 9 pm that evening and was alone in the building. Just after midday on November 2, Knox called Kercher's English phone. But though Kercher kept the phone in her jeans and could always be reached on it, the call was not answered. Knox then called Filomena Romanelli, one of the two Italian trainee lawyers she and Kercher shared the apartment with, and in a mixture of Italian and English said she was worried something had happened to Kercher, as on going to Via della Pergola 7 apartment earlier that morning Knox had noticed an open front door, bloodstains (including a footprint) in the bathroom, and Kercher's bedroom door locked. Knox and Sollecito then went to Via della Pergola 7, and on getting no answer from Kercher unsuccessfully tried to break in the bedroom door, leaving it noticeably damaged. At 12:47 pm, Knox called her mother and was told to contact the police as an emergency.

Sollecito called the Carabinieri, one of Italy's national police forces, getting through at 12:51 PM. He was recorded telling them there had been a break-in with nothing taken, and the emergency was that Kercher's door was locked, she was not answering calls to her phone, and there were bloodstains. Police telecommunications investigators arrived to inquire about an abandoned phone, which was in fact Kercher's Italian unit. Romanelli arrived and took over, explaining the situation to the police who were informed about Kercher's English phone, which had been handed in as a result of its ringing when Knox called it. On discovering Kercher's English phone had been found dumped, Romanelli demanded that the policemen force Kercher's bedroom door open, but they did not think the circumstances warranted damaging private property.  The door was then kicked in by a friend of Romanelli, and Kercher's body was discovered on the floor. She had been stabbed and died of blood loss from neck wounds.

Investigation
The first detectives on the scene were Monica Napoleoni and her superior Marco Chiacchiera. Napoleoni conducted the initial interviews and quizzed Knox about her failure to immediately raise the alarm, which was later widely seen as an anomalous feature of Knox's behaviour. According to Knox, Napoleoni was hostile to her from the outset. Chiacchiera discounted the signs of a break-in, deeming them clearly faked by the killer. The police were not told the extent of Kercher's relationship with Silenzi in initial interviews. On November 4, the same day Chiacchiera was quoted as saying that someone known to Kercher and let into the building by her might be responsible for her murder, Guede is believed to have left Perugia.

Interviews, arrest, and arraignment
Over the following days Knox was repeatedly interviewed, ostensibly as someone who might become a witness. She told police that on November 1 she received a text from Lumumba advising that her evening waitressing shift had been cancelled and she had stayed over at Sollecito's apartment, only going back to the apartment she shared with Kercher on the morning the body was discovered. Knox was not provided with legal counsel, as Italian law only mandates the appointment of a lawyer for someone suspected of a crime. On the night of November 5, Knox voluntarily went to the police station, although what followed is a matter of dispute. Police arrested Knox, Sollecito, and Patrick Lumumba on November 6, 2007. Charges against Lumumba were dropped a short time later.

At her trial, Knox testified that she had spent hours maintaining her original story, that she had been with Sollecito at his flat all night and had no knowledge of the murder, but a group of police would not believe her. Knox said, "I wasn't just stressed and pressurised; I was manipulated"; she testified to being told by the interpreter, "probably I didn't remember well because I was traumatised. So I should try to remember something else." Knox stated, "they said they were convinced that I was protecting someone. They were saying 'Who is it? Who is it?' They were saying: 'Here's the message on your telephone, you wanted to meet up with him, you are a stupid liar." Knox also said that a policewoman "was saying 'Come on, come on, remember' and then – slap – she hit me. Then 'come on, come on' and – slap – another one".

Knox said she had requested a lawyer but was told it would make things worse for her, and that she would go to jail for thirty years; she also said she was not allowed access to food, water, or the bathroom. Ficarra and policewoman Lorena Zugarini testified that during the interview Knox was given access to food, water, hot drinks, and the lavatory. They further said Knox was asked about a lawyer but did not have one, was not hit at any time, and interviewed "firmly but politely". Under pressure, Knox falsely stated that she had been home when Kercher was killed, and that she thought the murderer was Lumumba (who Knox knew had been serving customers at his bar all that night). Knox, Sollecito, and Lumumba were taken into custody and charged with the murder. Her first meeting with her legal counsel was on November 11. Chiacchiera, who thought the arrests were premature, dropped out of the investigation soon afterward, leaving Napoleoni in charge of a major investigation for the first time in her career.

Customers who Lumumba had been serving at his bar on the night of the murder gave him a complete alibi. After his bloodstained fingerprints were found on bedding under Kercher's body, Guede (who had fled to Germany) was extradited back to Italy. Guede, Knox, and Sollecito were then charged with committing the murder together. On November 30, a panel of three judges endorsed the charges, and ordered Knox and Sollecito held in detention pending a trial. In a formal interview with Mignini, Knox said she had been brainwashed by police interrogators into accusing Lumumba and implicating herself.

Knox became the subject of unprecedented pre-trial media coverage drawing on unattributed leaks from the prosecution, including a best-selling Italian book whose author imagined or invented incidents that were purported to have occurred in Knox's private life.

Italian legal procedure
In 1989, Italy reformed its inquisitorial system, introducing elements of US-style adversarial procedure. The changes were intended to remove an inquisitorial continuity between the investigatory phase and the basis for a decision at trial, but in practice they took control of inquiries away from police and gave prosecutors authority over the preliminary investigation. Although they have considerable authority over early inquiries and discretion in bringing charges, Italian prosecutors do not customarily use their powers in the aggressive way common in the US system.

Unless the defendant opts for a fast track trial (a relatively inquisitorial procedure), murder trials are heard by a Corte d'Assise, which is less likely to exclude evidence as prejudicial than a US court. Two presiding professional trial judges, who also vote on the verdict, are expected to correct any bias of the six lay-judges during their deliberations. An acquittal can be appealed by the prosecution, and faulty application of legal principles in the judges' detailed report on their decision can be grounds for overturning the verdict.

A defendant who gives evidence is not given an oath, because they are not considered to be a witness. The settled verdict of another court can be used without collaboration to support circumstantial evidence; in Knox's case the official report on Guede's conviction was introduced as showing that Guede had accomplices. If the Supreme Court grants an appeal against a guilty verdict, it usually sends the case back to be re-heard. It can also dismiss the prosecution case, although this is rare.

Trial of Guede
Guede fled to Germany shortly after the murder. During a November 19, 2007 Skype conversation with his friend Giacomo Benedetti, Guede did not mention Knox or Sollecito as being in the building on the night of the murder. Later his account changed and he indirectly implicated them in the murder, which he denied involvement in. Guede was arrested in Germany on November 20, then extradited to Italy on December 6. Guede opted to be tried in a special fast track procedure by Judge Micheli. He was not charged with having had a knife. He did not testify and was not questioned about his statements, which had altered from his original version. Guede was convicted of murder, but the official judges' report on the conviction specified that he had not had a knife or stabbed the victim, or stolen any of Kercher's possessions. Micheli's finding that Guede must have had an accomplice gave support to the later prosecution of Knox.

The judges reasoned that Guede would not have faked a burglary, because it would have pointed to him in view of his own earlier break-ins (though at the time of the murder he was known to police only for being detained for trespassing in Florence). Despite Guede saying that Kercher had let him in through the entry door, the judges decided against the possibility of Guede's having gotten in by simply knocking on the door, because they thought Kercher would not have opened the cottage door to him (although she knew he was an acquaintance of her boyfriend, Giacomo Silenzi). In his original account, Guede had said that Kercher's confrontation with her killer had started at the entry door. One legal commentator on the case thought that insufficient consideration had been given to the possibility that Guede had called at the house on some pretext while Kercher was alone there, murdered her after she opened the door to him, and faked a burglary to cover his tracks.

In October 2008, Guede was found guilty of the sexual assault and murder of Kercher and sentenced to 30 years' imprisonment. His prison sentence was ultimately reduced to 16 years. (He was later given an early release in December 2020 and authorized to finish his sentence with community service. Amanda Knox was dissatisfied with his early release and spoke publicly against it.)

First trial of Knox and Sollecito
In 2009, Knox and Sollecito pleaded not guilty at a Corte d'Assise on charges of murder, sexual assault, carrying a knife (which Guede had not been charged with), simulating a burglary, and theft of 300 euros, two credit cards, and two mobile phones. There was no charge in relation to Kercher's missing keys to the entry door and her bedroom door, although Guede's trial judgement said he had not stolen anything. There was a separate but concurrent trial of Knox with the same jury as her murder trial in which she was accused of falsely denouncing her employer for the murder. Knox's police interrogation was deemed improper and ruled inadmissible for the murder trial, but was heard in her nominally separate trial for false denunciation.

Prosecution case
According to the prosecution, Knox's first call of November 2, to Kercher's English phone, was to ascertain if Kercher's phones had been found, and Sollecito had tried to break in the bedroom door because after he and Knox locked it behind them, they realized they had left something that might incriminate them. Knox's call to her mother in Seattle, a quarter of an hour before the discovery of the body, was said by prosecutors to show Knox was acting as if something serious might have happened before the point in time when an innocent person would have such concern.

A prosecution witness, homeless man Antonio Curatolo, said Knox and Sollecito were in a nearby square on the night of the murder. Prosecutors advanced a single piece of forensic evidence linking Sollecito to Kercher's bedroom, where the murder had taken place: fragments of his DNA on Kercher's bra clasp. Giulia Bongiorno, leading Sollecito's defence, questioned how Sollecito's DNA could have gotten on the small metal clasp of the bra, but not on the fabric of the bra back strap from which it was torn. "How can you touch the hook without touching the cloth?" Bongiorno asked. The back strap of the bra had multiple traces of DNA belonging to Guede. According to the prosecution's reconstruction, Knox had attacked Kercher in her bedroom, repeatedly banged her head against a wall, forcefully held her face, and tried to strangle her. Guede, Knox and Sollecito had removed Kercher's jeans, and held her on her hands and knees while Guede had sexually abused her. Knox had cut Kercher with a knife before inflicting the fatal stab wound; then faked a burglary. The judge pointedly questioned Knox about a number of details, especially concerning her phone calls to her mother and Romanelli.

Defense case
The defense suggested that Guede was a lone killer who had murdered Kercher after breaking in. Knox's lawyers pointed out that no shoe prints, clothing fibers, hairs, fingerprints, skin cells, or DNA of Knox's were found on Kercher's body, clothes, handbag, or anywhere else in Kercher's bedroom. The prosecution alleged that all forensic traces in the room that would have incriminated Knox had been wiped away by her and Sollecito. Knox's lawyers said it would have been impossible to selectively remove her traces, and emphasized that Guede's shoe prints, fingerprints, and DNA were found in Kercher's bedroom.

Guede's DNA was on the strap of Kercher's bra, which had been torn off, and his DNA was found on a vaginal swab taken from her body. Guede's bloody palm print was on a pillow that had been placed under Kercher's hips. Guede's DNA, mixed with Kercher's, was on the left sleeve of her bloody sweatshirt and in bloodstains inside her shoulder bag, from which 300 euros and credit cards had been stolen. Both sets of defence lawyers requested the judges to order independent reviews of evidence including DNA and the compatibility of the wounds with the alleged murder weapon; the request was denied. In final pleas to the court, Sollecito's lawyer described Knox as "a weak and fragile girl" who had been "duped by the police". Knox's lawyer pointed to text messages between Knox and Kercher as showing that they had been friends.

Verdict and controversy
On December 5, 2009, Knox, by then 22, was convicted on charges of faking a break-in, defamation, sexual violence, and murder, and was sentenced to 26 years imprisonment. Sollecito was sentenced to 25 years. In Italy, opinion was not generally favorable toward Knox, and an Italian jurist remarked: "This is the simplest and fairest criminal trial one could possibly think of in terms of evidence."

In the United States, the verdict was widely viewed as a miscarriage of justice. American lawyers expressed concern about pre-trial publicity, and statements excluded from the murder case being allowed for a contemporaneous civil suit heard by the same jury. Knox's defense attorneys were seen as, by American standards, passive in the face of the prosecution's use of character assassination. Although acknowledging that Knox might have been a person of interest for American police in similar circumstances, journalist Nina Burleigh, who had spent months in Perugia during the trial while researching a book on the case, said the conviction had not been based on solid proof, and there had been resentment toward the Knox family that amounted to "anti-Americanism".

A number of US experts spoke out against DNA evidence used by the prosecution. According to consultant Greg Hampikian, director of the Idaho Innocence Project, the Italian forensic police could not replicate the key result, claimed to have successfully identified DNA at levels below those an American laboratory would attempt to analyse, and never supplied validation of their methods. Knox was indicted in 2010 on charges of defamation against the police for saying she had been struck across her head during the interview in which she incriminated herself.

In May 2011, Hampikian said forensic results from the crime scene pointed to Guede as the killer and to his having acted on his own.

Acquittal and release

A Corte d'Assise verdict of guilty is not a definitive conviction. What is in effect a new trial, Corte d'Assise d'Appello, reviews the case. The appeal (or second grade) trial began November 2010 and was presided over by Judges Claudio Pratillo Hellmann and Massimo Zanetti. A court-ordered review of the contested DNA evidence by independent experts noted numerous basic errors in the gathering and analysis of the evidence, and concluded that no evidential trace of Kercher's DNA had been found on the alleged murder weapon, which police had found in Sollecito's kitchen. The review found the forensic police examination showed evidence of multiple males' DNA fragments on the bra clasp, which had been lost on the floor for 47 days, the court-appointed expert testified the context strongly suggested contamination. On October 3, 2011, Knox and Sollecito were found not guilty of the murder.

In an official statement giving the grounds for the acquittals, Hellmann said Knox had been confused by interviews of "obsessive duration" in a language she was still learning, and forensic evidence did not support the idea that Knox and Sollecito had been present at the murder. It was emphasized that Knox's first calls raised the alarm and brought the police, which made the prosecution's assertion that she had been trying to delay discovery of the body untenable. Her and Sollecito's accounts failing to completely match did not constitute evidence they had given a false alibi. Discounting Curatolo's testimony as self-contradictory, the judges observed that he was a heroin addict. Having noted that there was no evidence of any phone calls or texts between Knox or Sollecito and Guede, the judges concluded there was a "material non-existence" of evidence to support the guilty verdicts, and that an association among Sollecito, Knox, and Guede to commit the murder was "far from probable".

The false accusation conviction in relation to her employer was upheld, and Judge Hellman imposed a three-year sentence although this was nominal, being less than Knox had already served. She was immediately released, and returned to her Seattle home.

Knox wrote a letter to Corrado Maria Daclon, Secretary General of the Italy–USA Foundation, the day after regaining her freedom:

Retrial 
On March 26, 2013, Italy's highest court, the Supreme Court of Cassation set aside the acquittals of the Hellmann second level trial on the grounds that it had gone beyond the remit of a Corte d'Assise d'Appello by not ordering new DNA tests and failing to give weight to circumstantial evidence in context such as Knox's accusation of the bar owner in the disputed interviews. A note Knox composed in the police station (not mentioning Guede) was regarded by the Supreme Court as confirmation that she and Guede were present in Via della Pergola 7 while Kercher was attacked. A retrial was ordered. Knox was represented, but remained in the United States.

Judge Nencini presided at the retrial, and granted a prosecution request for analysis of a previously unexamined DNA sample found on a kitchen knife of Sollecito's, which the prosecution alleged was the murder weapon based on the forensic police reporting that Kercher's DNA was on it, a conclusion discredited by court-appointed experts at the appeal trial. When the unexamined sample was tested, no DNA belonging to Kercher was found. On January 30, 2014, Knox and Sollecito were found guilty. In their written explanation the judges emphasised Guede's fast-track verdict report was a judicial reference point establishing that he had not acted alone. The Nencini verdict report said there must have been a cleanup to remove traces of Knox from the building while leaving Guede's. The report said that there had been no burglary and the signs of one were staged. It did not consider the possibility of Guede's having been responsible for faking a break-in.

Forensic controversy continues
Although not part of the defense's team of experts, an authority on the forensic use of DNA, Professor Peter Gill, publicly said that the case against Knox and Sollecito was misconceived because they had a legitimate excuse for their DNA being present on Sollecito's kitchen knife, and in the crime scene apartment. According to Gill, the DNA fragment from Sollecito on the bra clasp could have got there through Sollecito having touched the handle of Kercher's door while trying to force it, enabling transfer of his DNA to the bra clasp inside the bedroom on the latex gloves used by investigators.

Final decision
On March 27, 2015, the ultimate appeal by Knox and Sollecito was heard by the Supreme Court of Cassation; it ruled that the case was without foundation, thereby definitively acquitting them of the murder. Her defamation conviction was upheld but the three-year sentence was deemed served by the time she had already spent in prison. Rather than merely declaring that there were errors in the earlier court cases or that there was not enough evidence to convict, the court ruled that Knox and Sollecito were innocent of involvement in the murder.
On September 7, 2015, the Court published the report on the acquittal, citing "glaring errors", "investigative amnesia", and "guilty omissions", where a five-judge panel said that the prosecutors who won the original murder conviction failed to prove a "whole truth" to back up the scenario that Knox and Sollecito killed Kercher. They also stated that there were "sensational failures" in the investigation, and that the lower court had been guilty of "culpable omissions" in ignoring expert testimony that demonstrated contamination of evidence.

Compensation
On January 24, 2019, the European Court of Human Rights (ECHR) ordered Italy to pay compensation to Knox for violating her rights in the hours after her arrest in Perugia. Italy was ordered to pay Knox 18,400 Euros (about US$20,800) for not providing her with either a lawyer or a competent interpreter when she was first held in custody.

Personal and professional life
After returning to the United States, Knox completed her degree and worked on a book about her case. She was often followed by paparazzi. Her family incurred large debts from the years of supporting her in Italy and were left insolvent, the proceeds from Waiting to Be Heard: A Memoir having gone to pay legal fees to her Italian lawyers. Knox has been a reviewer and journalist for the then West Seattle Herald, later subsumed into Westside Seattle, and attended events of the Innocence Project and related organizations. In a 2017 interview, Knox said she was devoting herself to writing and activism for the wrongfully accused. She hosted The Scarlet Letter Reports on Facebook Watch, a series which examined the "gendered nature of public shaming". Knox also hosts a podcast, The Truth About True Crime. She has been a featured speaker at fundraising events for non-profits, including the Innocence Project. In June 2019, Knox returned to Italy as a keynote speaker at a conference on criminal justice, where she was part of a panel titled "Trial by Media".

Knox is married to author Christopher Robinson, who is connected to the Robinson Newspapers. In October 2021, Knox announced the birth of their daughter in an interview with The New York Times.

Media

Books

Documentaries

  A documentary broadcast in the United States
 
  Diane Sawyer was the first to interview Knox after she was freed.
 , a Netflix Original Documentary

Film 

 , an American true crime television film that first aired on the Lifetime network.
 The Face of an Angel a 2014 British psychological thriller directed by Michael Winterbottom and written by Paul Viragh. The film was inspired by the book Angel Face, drawn from crime coverage by Newsweek/Daily Beast writer Barbie Latza Nadeau. The film stars Kate Beckinsale, Daniel Brühl, and Cara Delevingne.
 Stillwater a 2021 film based on Knox's story. Knox accused actor Matt Damon and director Tom McCarthy of ripping off her story without her consent at the expense of her reputation.

Television 

 Law & Order: Special Victims Unit (December 3, 2020). "Remember Me in Quarantine." Episode 3 of Season 22 is loosely based on the murder of Meredith Kercher. The main female antagonist is branded as "Sexy Lexi" and "Lockdown Lexi", a play on "Foxy Knoxy." Knox criticized that she was not consulted or compensated for the episode, "The latest @nbcsvu is based on my case, & includes a character named "Sexy Lexi." As per usual, when the worst experience of my life is cannibalized for entertainment..."

See also

List of miscarriage of justice cases

References

External links 
 
 ; a Facebook Watch series of interviews hosted by Knox
 Collected news and articles at The Guardian
 

1987 births
American people of German descent
American women journalists
American women non-fiction writers
False confessions
Living people
Overturned convictions in Italy
People acquitted of murder
American people wrongfully convicted of murder
University of Washington alumni
Writers from Seattle
21st-century American women